Jack Nicklaus Golf Club Korea in Incheon, South Korea, is the focal point of Songdo IBD's environmentally focused green space program. It is an 18-hole championship golf course designed by Nicklaus Design, headed by Jack Nicklaus.

From the back tees, the course exceeds  and presents a challenge to even the most talented golfers. Within the golf course, there will be a Western-style fairway community, including 179 detached single family villas.

Events
The club hosted the eleventh Presidents Cup in 2015, the first held in Asia. Before it officially opened, it was the site of a Champions Tour tournament in September 2010, the Posco E&C Songdo Championship, a first for that tour in Asia. A second edition was played in 2011, as the Songdo IBD Championship. The International Crown, an eight-nation team event on the LPGA Tour, is scheduled for 2018 and will be the first held outside the United States.

Scorecard

 
 
 

Source:

References

External links
 – 
Presidents Cup – official site
International Crown – official site 

Sports venues in Incheon
Golf clubs and courses in South Korea
Songdo International Business District
Presidents Cup venues